Denis Byam (born 29 January 1977) is a Vincentian cricketer. He played in three first-class and six List A matches for the Windward Islands from 1996 to 2003.

See also
 List of Windward Islands first-class cricketers

References

External links
 

1977 births
Living people
Saint Vincent and the Grenadines cricketers
Windward Islands cricketers